Vigía del Fuerte Airport  is an airstrip serving the river town of Vigía del Fuerte and the surrounding area, in the Antioquia Department of Colombia. The airstrip used to be located inside the town, and made of grass. As the town expanded the airstrip was relocated, the old airstrip was refurbished to be a park, retaining its original shape.

The river is locally the boundary between the Antioquia and Chocó Departments of Colombia.

In 2013, presumed FARC rebels attacked the new airstrip and set fire to an aircraft.

See also

Transport in Colombia
List of airports in Colombia

References

External links
OpenStreetMap - Vigía del Fuerte
OurAirports - Vigía del Fuerte
FallingRain - Vigía del Fuerte

Airports in Colombia